Michael Cameron "Mike" Smith (born September 16, 1967) is a Canadian decathlete from Kenora, Ontario.

Biography
He attended Pinecrest Elementary School, Lakewood Intermediate School, Beaver Brae Secondary School in Kenora, Ontario, and then Central Technical School in Toronto for his final year of high school.

Smith attended the University of Toronto Commerce program during his athletic career.  He was coached by Andy Higgins while living in Toronto, Ontario and then by Les Gramantik when he moved to live and train in Calgary, Alberta in 1994.

Smith won a silver medal at the World Junior Track and Field Championships in 1986. At the 1988 Olympics in Seoul, he placed 14th.  At the 1990 Commonwealth Games Smith won a gold medal. In 1991, he was the silver medal winner at the World Track and Field Championships, and was the first North American to win the Götzis International Decathlon, which he won again in 1996.

In 1992 at Barcelona, Spain, Smith was the opening ceremonies flag bearer for Canada at the Olympics.  Unfortunately during the decathlon Smith pulled a hamstring and was forced to withdraw on the first day of the two-day competition.  In 1994, he won gold at the Commonwealth Games for the second time.

Smith was ranked in the top 10 in the world for 10 years in a row from 1989 to 1998 with his highest rankings being #2 in the world in 1991 and #3 in the world in 1995.

Personal Best Performances

Smith held the Canadian Record in the decathlon with a total of 8626 points set in Gotzis Austria in 1996. Smith's record was broken by Damian Warner, with a total of 8659 points, at the 2015 Pan American Games.

The sum of Smith's overall personal bests in the individual disciplines of decathlon totals 9,362 points (the third best ever after Ashton Eaton & Dan O'Brien).

Day 1: 100 meters - 10.70 seconds, Long Jump - 7.76 meters, Shot Put - 18.03 meters, High Jump - 2.14 meters, 400 meters - 47.06 seconds
Day 2: 110 meter hurdles - 14.24 seconds, Discus Throw - 52.90 meters, Pole Vault - 5.20 meters, Javelin Throw - 71.22 meters, 1500 meters - 4:20,04

Total: 9362 points

Smith still holds the world's best performance for the 3 combined throwing events in decathlon (shot put, discus, javelin).

Smith retired from the sport of decathlon in 1999 and went on to a career in financial services and wealth management. He also works for CBC Television Sports and CTV Television as a color commentator for track and field events; in this capacity, he received a Canadian Screen Award nomination for Best Sports Analyst at the 10th Canadian Screen Awards as a commentator for CBC Television's coverage of the 2020 Summer Olympics.

Achievements

See also
 Canadian records in track and field

References

External links
 
 
 
 
 
 

1967 births
Athletes (track and field) at the 1986 Commonwealth Games
Athletes (track and field) at the 1988 Summer Olympics
Athletes (track and field) at the 1990 Commonwealth Games
Athletes (track and field) at the 1992 Summer Olympics
Athletes (track and field) at the 1994 Commonwealth Games
Athletes (track and field) at the 1996 Summer Olympics
Athletes (track and field) at the 1998 Commonwealth Games
Canadian decathletes
Commonwealth Games gold medallists for Canada
Commonwealth Games bronze medallists for Canada
Living people
Olympic track and field athletes of Canada
Sportspeople from Kenora
World Athletics Championships medalists
World Athletics Championships athletes for Canada
Track and field athletes from Ontario
Commonwealth Games medallists in athletics
Black Canadian track and field athletes
Medallists at the 1990 Commonwealth Games
Medallists at the 1994 Commonwealth Games
Medallists at the 1998 Commonwealth Games